Kallur is a village in the Gubbi subdistrict of the Tumkur district of Karnataka state in India.  It has a Gram Panchayat. The village is located on the bank of the Shimsha river. The village is blessed with the natural resources. It is mainly known for its handloom silk sarees. The Handloom work is being performed by traditionally, this work is transferred from their ancestors (called Vamshya parampare). The major caste in this village is Hindu Devanga.And (lingayatha)

Attractions

Major attractions in this village are Sri Rama Mandira (Temple), Sri Rudra muni Swamy temple, Vasudeva Temple and Doddamma temple and Kallur Lake. In the Rama Mandira temple the deities are made of White Stone (called Amrutha shile). Panduranga (Vijaya Vittal) temple built in recent days in 2009 is also of interest.

Festivals

The village also famous for an annual Festival called Doddaammana Habba (festival) which is celebrated after 21 days from the festival of ugadi. People from all over Karnataka gather to seek the blessing of Goddess Doddamma. Major attraction of the festival was the bull sacrifice for the Goddess, but now it's been stopped

Institutions

A Pre-University College called SVS Gangothri Pre University College (with management at Chikkakallur), Siddaganga High School (Siddaganga mutt's school) and Pragathi Schools are major private educational institutions in the village.

Notable residents

K G Nagarajappa, renowned poet and literary figure is from this village. He received the Rajyotsava award in the year 2015.

Nataraj K G, is a social server, who has worked tirelessly for the upliftment of this village. He has donated his agricultural land for the construction of a Hospital, built roads, and ensured mobile connectivity for the village.

Shankara Shetty K N ,  also known as "Parisara Premi", is a Karnataka environmentalist from the district of Tumkur, noted for his work in planting and tending thousands of trees with the support of his students along with a huge number of Campaigns to 'Save Trees'.And he is a well-trained Yoga master of Kallur village, trained around 100 plus villagers 20 years back. 
He received MA(Political Science) Graduation from the Mysuru University and worked as a Social Teacher in various High Schools. His work has been honored with the Rashtrapati Award of India for Best Teacher(2014). his work was recognized by the Government of India and he was conferred with Vinayak Damodar Savarkar Award in 2013(Andaman & Nicobar) and Bhagavan Budha National Fellowship Award from Chaitanya Academy New Delhi in 2012, Best Teacher Award from the Karnataka State Government and he is still continuing in planting the trees with the help of villagers .

References

Cities and towns in Tumkur district